The Penumbra Podcast is a science fiction and fantasy podcast.

History 
The Penumbra Podcast was created by Harley Takagi Kaner and Kevin Vibert. There are two main stories within The Penumbra Podcast: The Second Citadel, which takes place inside a fantasy world where humans are battling monsters; and Juno Steel; a detective noir story set in the distant future. Juno is a handsome, trenchcoat-wearing black detective.

From 2016 to 2018, The Penumbra Podcast employed artist Mikaela Buckley to make art for the characters of the podcast. In her depictions, some characters (most notably Juno Steel) were black. Some people felt that the podcast was brownwashing the characters without putting actual effort in, as the voice actors almost exclusively were white. The Penumbra Podcast issued an official apology on the 24th of September, 2021, a few weeks after awareness about the topic was raised. Merchandise featuring Buckley's art was discontinued. The Penumbra Podcast still has her art on their website for archival purposes.

Reception 
The Penumbra has received positive attention for its heavy-LGBTQIA+ themes. The site Book Riot labeled it one of "the best fiction podcasts you need to listen to." Melissa Locker of The Guardian called the podcast "a storytelling show that gives classic tales a head-spinning twist". It was ranked number 17 in Tumblr's 2019 list of top web series. Mackenzie Hubbard of The Michigan Daily, said "I've listened to [the podcast] four times and I’ve cried each time".

According to Joshua Dudley of Forbes, the podcast has won six different AudioVerse Awards. The podcast won "Best New Original, Long Form, Small Cast, Ongoing Production" in 2016. In 2017, "Best Actress in a Supporting role for an Ongoing, Dramatic, Production" went to Kate Jones for playing the character Rita in Penumbra, "Best Actor in a Supporting role for an Ongoing, Dramatic, Production" went to Noah Simes for playing Lord Arum, and "Best Actor in a Leading role for an Ongoing, Dramatic, Production" went to Joshua Ilon for playing Juno Steel. The podcast also won best "Audio Play Production" in 2019 along with more awards for acting.

See also 
 List of LGBT characters in radio and podcasts
 List of LGBT podcasts

References

External links 
 

Audio podcasts
2016 podcast debuts
LGBT-related podcasts
Fantasy podcasts
Science fiction podcasts
American podcasts
Patreon creators
Scripted podcasts